This is a list of notable Serbian Americans, including both original immigrants who obtained American citizenship and their American descendants.

To be included in this list, the person must have a Wikipedia article showing they are Serbian American or must have references showing they are Serbian American and are notable.

Academics

 Dimitrije Đorđević, historian
 Bogdan Denitch, sociologist
 Boyan Jovanovic, economics professor at New York University
 Veselin Kesich, professor of theology and author
 Petar V. Kokotovic, engineering professor at the University of California, Santa Barbara
 Milivoje Kostic, thermodynamicist and professor Emeritus at Northern Illinois University
 Jelena Kovacevic, Dean of Engineering at NYU’s Tandon School and Carnegie Mellon University
 Rade Paravina, professor with tenure at the University of Texas Health Science Center at Houston, School of Dentistry, and director of the Houston Center for Biomaterials & Biomimetics
 Radovan Kovacevic, professor and inventor
 Gojko Lalic, chemistry professor at the University of Washington
 Alexander Margulis, clinical professor of radiology
 Vasa Mihich, painter and sculptor, professor at the University of California, Los Angeles
 Branko Milanović, economist
 Nada Martinović, professor of music at Kent State University, music pedagogue, conductor, and researcher
 Nikola Moravčević, literary historian, literary critic, academic and novelist
 Anna Novakov, art historian, critic, educator, and curator
 Zorica Pantic, president of Wentworth Institute of Technology
 Nataša Pavlović, mathematics professor at the University of Texas at Austin, Sloan Research Fellow
 Traian Stoianovich, historian and history professor at Rutgers University
 Dragoslav D. Šiljak, engineering professor at Santa Clara University
 Wayne S. Vucinich, historian and professor at Stanford University
 Miloš Velimirović, musicologist, a music professor at Yale University, Professor Emeritus
 Jasmina Vujic, nuclear engineering professor at Berkeley, 1st female nuclear engineering department chair in the US
 Gordana Vunjak-Novakovic, University Professor, Columbia University in the City of New York

Artists and designers
 Marina Abramović, performance artist
 Louis D. Astorino, architect
 Ivana Bašić (artist), sculptor
 Jelena Behrend, jewelry designer
 Rushka Bergman, fashion stylist and editor
 John David Brcin, sculptor
 Tom Carapic, found object artist
 Marek Djordjevic, automobile designer
 Srdjan Jovanovic Weiss, Serbian-born architect and urban planner
 Ana Kras, furniture designer, photographer, artist
 Zoran Ladicorbic, fashion designer
 Lili Lakich, neon light artist
 Marjorie Mikasen, painter, author
 Ana Prvacki, performance artist
 Gorjana Reidel, jewelry designer
 Alexander Sambugnac, artist, sculptor
 George Styler, fashion designer
 Daniel Vosovic, fashion designer
 Vasa Mihich, famous for his sculpture of colored pieces of acrylic
 Savo Radulovic, painter and batik artist
 Nicholas Petkovich, priest and artist
 Alex Dzigurski, painter

Media
 Donald P. Bellisario, television producer
 Gordon Bijelonic, film producer
 Walt Bogdanich, award winning NY Times investigative journalist
 Peter Bogdanovich, film producer, director
 Boogie (Vladimir Milivojevich), documentary and portrait photographer
 Ellis Cannon, television personality
 Rasha Drachkovitch, television producer, president of 44 Blue Productions
 Tijana Ibrahimovic, fashion journalist
 Natalie Jacobson, television presenter
 Olgivanna Lloyd Wright, founder/director of the Frank Lloyd Wright Taliesin Fellowship
 Ika Panajotovic, film producer, tennis champion
 Anka Radakovich, magazine columnist
 Milena Rakocević, fashion photographer
 Michael Smerconish, CNN journalist
 Paul Stojanovich, television producer
 Jill Filipovic, journalist and feminist

Entertainers

Actors
 Sasha Alexander, actress
 Coco Austin, glamour model, actress
 Michael Bellisario, actor
 Troian Bellisario, actress
 Laura Benanti, actress
 Sara Brajovic, model and actress
 Lolita Davidovich, actress
 Brad Dexter, actor
 Divine, actor, singer, drag queen
 Jelena Gavrilovic, actress
 Judy Greer, actress (Serbian paternal grandmother)
 Gloria Grey, actress
 Adrienne Janic, actress, TV presenter
 Milla Jovovich, actress
 Stana Katic, actress
 Bela Lugosi, actor
 Karl Malden, actor, Oscar winner
 John Malkovich, actor, Primetime Emmy winner
 Margaret Markov, actress
 Dragan Mićanović, actor
 Milos Milos, actor, stunt double, bodyguard of actor Alain Delon
 Alex Nesic, actor
 Natalia Nogulich, actress
 Bojana Novakovic, actress
 Catherine Oxenberg, actress
 Iván Petrovich, silent screen star
 Nina Seničar, actress 
 Sarah Sokolovic, actress
 Michael Sorich, actor
 Stoya, dramatic actress, former adult film actress
 Inari Vachs, adult film actress
 Steve Vinovich, actor
 John Vivyan, actor
 Mirjana Joković, actress and drama coach
 Bill Radovich, actor
 Branko Tomović, actor
 Rade Šerbedžija, actor
 Michael Jelenic, actor

Directors and screenwriters
 Sanja Bestic, theatre director, writer, producer
 Peter Bogdanovich, film historian, director, writer, actor, producer, critic
 Andre Stojka, actor and screenwriter
 Steve Tesich, screenwriter, playwright, novelist, Academy Award Winner for Best Original Screenplay
 Slavko Vorkapić, Hollywood motion-picture montagist, Chair of USC School of Cinematic Arts
 Marina Zenovich, film producer, director

Musicians
 Baruch Arnon, classical pianist, renowned music teacher
 Marina Arsenijevic, concert pianist and composer
 Maja Bogdanović, cellist
 Muruga Booker, drummer, composer, recording artist
 Del Casher, guitarist, inventor
 Mike Dimkich, Punk guitarist (The Cult & Bad Religion)
 Dillon Francis, DJ and record producer
 Ivan Ilić, pianist
 Brandon Jovanovich, opera singer
 Milena Kitic, opera mezzo-soprano
 Lene Lovich, New Wave singer, songwriter, musician
 Charlie Marinkovich, singer, songwriter
 Jelena Mihailović (artistic name JelaCello), cellist
 Milan the Leather Boy, record producer, songwriter, recording artist
 Filip Mitrovic, composer
 Spud Murphy, jazz multi-instrumentalist, bandleader, arranger
 Ana Popovic, blues guitarist
 Nikola Resanovic, composer, music professor
 Rudolph Reti, musical analyst, composer, pianist
 Aleksandra Vrebalov, composer, musician
 Alexander Zonjic, flutist

Military personnel
 Jake Allex, Army sergeant, World War I, Medal of Honor recipient
 Teresa A. H. Djuric, Air Force brigadier general, highly decorated
 George Fisher, early leader of the Texas Revolution
 Rade Grbitch, Navy seaman, Medal of Honor recipient
 James I. Mestrovitch, Army sergeant, World War I, Medal of Honor recipient
 John W. Minick, Army staff sergeant, World War II, Medal of Honor recipient
 George Musulin, intelligence agent, World War II
 Mitchell Paige, Marines colonel, World War II, highly decorated
 Milo Radulovich, Air Force lieutenant
 Lance Sijan, Air Force captain, Vietnam War, Medal of Honor
 Mel Vojvodich, Air Force major general, Vietnam and Korea Wars, decorated
 George Vujnovich, intelligence agent, World War II, decorated

Politicians
 Melissa Bean, U.S. Representative for Illinois's 8th congressional district from 2005 to 2011
 Rod Blagojevich, served as the 40th Governor of Illinois from 2003 to 2009
 Mark Brnovich, attorney general of Arizona
 John Dapcevich, former Mayor of Sitka, Alaska
 Marko Dapcevich, most recent former Mayor of Sitka, Alaska
 Helen Delich Bentley, Republican member of the United States House of Representatives from Maryland from 1985 to 1995
 John Gregovich, politician, Nevada Senate
 Mike Pusich, former Mayor of Douglas, Alaska
 Bill Ray, politician, businessman and writer
 Mike Stepovich, last appointed territorial Governor of Alaska
 George Voinovich, former United States Senator from the state of Ohio from 1999 to 2011
 Rose Ann Vuich, first female member of the California State Senate
 Steve Vukovich, politician
 George N. Zenovich, served in the California State Senate and Assembly

Government
 George Michael Marovich, United States federal judge
 Mitchell Melich, solicitor for the Interior Department under the first Richard Nixon administration
 Alex Miller, Alaskan statehood lobbyist
 Zoran Popovich, senior judge on the Pennsylvania Superior Court
 Vukan R. Vuchic, public transport expert

Economy and business
 Nicholas Chabraja, lawyer, CEO at General Dynamics
 Mitchell M. Duchich, founder of Clover Leaf Dairy Company (Gary, Indiana), also founded a scholarship program
 William Jovanovich, businessman, director at Harcourt, Brace, Jovanovich (Harcourt publisher)
 Milan Mandarić, businessman
 Phebe Novakovic, businesswoman
 Milan Panić, businessman
 Milan Puskar, entrepreneur, philanthropist
 Steve Popovich, record company executive
 William G. Salatich, executive at Gillette, director of the Bob Hope Desert Classic Charity Golf Tournament
 Andy Stefanovich, business consultant, author

Scientists, inventors and engineers
 Krste Asanović, computer scientist
 Olga Boric-Lubecke, electrical engineer
 Slobodan Ćuk, electrical engineer
 Bernhard Caesar Einstein, physicist
 Marko V. Jaric, physicist
 Drago Jovanovich, designer, inventor of the gyrocopter
 Dusan Krajcinovic, mechanical engineer
 Miroslav Krstić, control theorist
 Bogdan Maglich, experimental nuclear physicist
 Nenad Medvidović, computer scientist
 Mihajlo D. Mesarovic, systems engineering
 Tihomir Novakov, physicist
 Branislav Notaros, electrical engineer
 Mihajlo Pupin, physicist, physical chemist
 Stojan Radic, electrical engineer
 Miodrag Radulovacki, scientist, inventor
 Aleksandar Stanković, electrical engineer
 Dejan Sobajic, electrical engineer
 Nataša Šešum, mathematician
 Nikola Tesla, inventor, electrical engineer, mechanical engineer and futurist
 Bane Vasic, electrical engineer
 Milan Vukcevich, chemist, Grandmaster chess problem composer, writer
 Vladimir Vukićević, software engineer
 John Vukovich, engineer, professor of biomedical engineering at Columbia University

Athletes

American football 
 Bob Babich,  NFL football player (Cleveland Browns)
 Mike Basrak, collegiate football player
 Novo Bojovic, NFL football player, (St. Louis Cardinals)
 Norm Bulaich, NFL football player (Baltimore Colts, Eagles, and Dolphins); AFC Pro Bowl squad 1971; Sports Illustrated cover (November 1971 issue
 Pete Catan, football player (Houston Gamblers)
 Maxx Crosby, NFL football player (Las Vegas Raiders)
 Walt Dropo, refused two BAA offers to play baseball with the Red Sox
 Filip Filipović, NFL football player (San Francisco 49ers, Minnesota Vikings, Philadelphia Eagles, Houston Texans, Chicago Bears)
 Bob Gain, NFL football player (Cleveland Browns), voted to the All NFL defensive team in 1958
 Sam Jankovich, GM of the New England Patriots, athletic director at the University of Miami
 Milan Lazetich, NFL football player (Cleveland Rams, Los Angeles Rams)
 Pete Lazetich, NFL football player (San Diego Chargers, Philadelphia Eagles)
 Mike Mamula, NFL football player (Philadelphia Eagles), recipient of the Eagles Ed Block Courage Award
 "Mad Dog" Mandich, NFL football player (Miami Dolphins, Pittsburgh Steelers), College Football Hall of Fame.
 Duke Maronic, NFL football player (Philadelphia Eagles)
 Scott Milanovich, NFL football player (Tampa Bay Buccaneers), coach
 Rex Mirich, NFL and AFL football player
 Mike Nixon, NFL coach
 Bob O'Billovich, football player, CFL coach
 Ed O'Bradovich, NFL football player (Chicago Bears)
 Bo Pelini, coach
 Milt Popovich, football player (Chicago Cardinals)
 Dan Radakovich, NFL football player, coach
 Bill Radovich, NFL football player (Detroit Lions)
 Dan Rains, NFL football player (Chicago Bears)
 Steve Ruzich, NFL football player  (Green Bay Packers)
 Paul Salata, NFL football player (49ers and Baltimore Colts)
 Alex Smith, NFL football player (Kansas City Chiefs)
 Alex Stepanovich, NFL football player (Cincinnati Bengals, Atlanta Falcons, and Pittsburgh Steelers)
 Joe Tepsic, played for Penn State before opting to play baseball for the Brooklyn Dodgers
 Tom Yewcic, NFL football player (Boston Patriots), also played baseball)

Baseball
 Erik Bakich, college baseball coach
 Brian Bogusevic, MLB player
 Jess Dobernic, MLB player
 Walt Dropo, MLB player
 Eli Grba, American League champion with the New York Yankees
 Mike Kekich, MLB player
 Mike Krsnich, MLB player
 Rocky Krsnich, MLB player
 Babe Martin, MLB player
 Doc Medich, MLB player
 Johnny Miljus, MLB player
 Paul Popovich, MLB player
 Ryan Radmanovich, MLB player and member of Canada Olympic baseball team
 Dave Rajsich, MLB player
 Gary Rajsich, MLB player
 Jeff Samardzija, player for the Chicago White Sox, also wide receiver at Notre Dame.
 Nick Strincevich, MLB player
 Pete Suder, MLB player
 Steve Sundra, 1939 World Series champion, pitched with the New York Yankees, Washington Senators, and St. Louis Browns
 Steve Swetonic, MLB player
 Joe Tepsic, MLB player
 Peter Vuckovich, AL Cy Young winner: 1982
 George Vukovich, MLB player
 John Vukovich, MLB player and coach
 Christian Yelich, MLB player

Basketball
 Vlade Divac,  basketball player, general manager of the Sacramento Kings
 George Glamack, basketball player
 Bato Govedarica, basketball player
 Tim Jankovich, college basketball coach
 Nikola Jokic, basketball player Denver Nuggets
 Frank Kaminsky, basketball player, parental Serbian heritage
 Igor Kokoškov, basketball coach
 Nick Lalich, basketball player
 Pete Lalich, basketball player
 Pete Maravich, basketball player
 Press Maravich, basketball player and coach
 Ed Melvin, basketball player and coach
 Dave Pilipovich, college basketball coach
 Gregg Popovich, NBA basketball coach, Serbian father
 Goran Suton, basketball player
 Lou Stefanovic, basketball player
 Sasha Stefanovic, basketball player
 Peja Stojaković, basketball player
 Mike Todorovich, basketball player and coach
 Jim Zeravich, basketball player

Ice hockey
 Ivan Boldirev, ice hockey (NHL) player
 John Polich, ice hockey (NHL) player
 Stan Smrke, ice hockey (NHL) player
 Mick Vukota, ice hockey (NHL) player
 Milan Lučić, ice hockey (NHL) player

Other sports
 Nikola Bogojevic, professional wrestler performing as "Otis Dozovic"
 Milorad Čavić, swimmer
 Jasna Fazlić, table tennis player
 Sam Jankovich, sports administrator
 Sacha Kljestan, soccer player, Serbian father
 Ilija Lupulesku, table tennis champion
 Trevor Matich, American football analyst
 Stevan Mićić, freestyle and collegiate wrestler
 Andrija Novakovich, soccer player
 Derek Popovich, MISL soccer player
 Preki, soccer player
 Sandra Spuzich, golfer, winner of U.S. Women's Open
 Neven Subotić, soccer player
 Bojana Todorović, volleyball player
 Ognjen Topic, Muay Thai Boxing champion
 Rhonda Rajsich, racquetball player
 Pete Romcevich, racecar driver
 Bill Vukovich, automobile racing driver
 Bill Vukovich II, automobile racing driver
 Billy Vukovich III, automobile racing driver
 Trifun Živanović, figure skater, Serbian father
 Zoran Zorkic, golfer

Writers and Editors
 Drenka Willen of Harcourt Brace Jovanovich, Inc. fame
 Alma Alexander, fantasy writer
 Branko Mikasinovich, a scholar of Yugoslav and Serbian literature, noted Slavist
 Maja Herman Sekulić, writer, translator, poet, and university professor
 Charles Simic, poet, co-poetry editor of the Paris Review
 Vojislav Stanimirović, journalist, businessman
 Rose Gojich Stephenson-Goodknight, Wikipedian; visiting scholar
 Dejan Stojanović, poet, writer, essayist, philosopher, businessman, and journalist
 Milivoy Stoyan Stanoyevich, author
 William Jovanovich, publisher and writer
 Michael Pupin, author of Pulitzer Prize-winning biography From Immigrant to Inventor
 Dana Todorović, writer and translator

Other
 George Fisher, explorer, customs officer and early leader of the Texas Revolution
 John Hajdukovich, pioneer and entrepreneur in Big Delta
 Christopher (Kovacevich), metropolitan bishop
 Mateja Matejić, priest
 Varnava Nastić, bishop of Hvosno and Orthodox saint
 Stephen Yokich, American labor union activist, President of the United Auto Workers

See also

 List of Serbian Canadians
 List of Serbs.

References

Sources

External links
 USA SERBS/Serbian-American network
 Famous Serbian Americans

Serbian Americans
 

Serbian Americans
Serbian
Americans